The Boquillas Formation is a geologic formation deposited during the Late Cretaceous in modern-day West Texas.  It is typically composed of alternating marls and limestones with thin volcanic ash beds (bentonites).  It was named for outcrops near the former Boquillas post office in Big Bend National Park.  The term Boquillas Formation has been used for rocks that outcrop from Del Rio, Texas to as far west as Doña Ana County, New Mexico.

Vertebrate fossils found in the Boquillas Formation include mosasaurs, fish bones, and shark's teeth. Invertebrate fossils found in the formation include ammonites, swimming crinoids, inoceramid clams, sea urchins, oysters, and foraminifera

References

Cretaceous geology of Texas
Geologic formations of the United States
Cenomanian Stage
Turonian Stage
Coniacian Stage
Santonian Stage